Potvis (Dutch: Sperm whale) was a Potvis class (modified ) of the Royal Netherlands Navy.

Ship history
The submarine was laid down on 17 September 1962 at the Wilton-Fijenoord shipyard in Schiedam and launched on 12 January 1965. 2 November 1965 she was commissioned in the Dutch navy.

In January 1968 Potvis and  left the port of Den Helder for a war simulation in the northern Atlantic Ocean that would last 5 weeks.
The boat was overhauled in 1970 at the Wilton-Fijenoord shipyard.
From October until November 1976 Potvis and the tender Mercuur perform torpedo system trials at Andros, Bahamas.
From 2 to 21 July 1978 Potvis, Dolfijn,  and  practiced firing exercises.

On 19 November 1982 a refit of the boat started at the Naval Yard in Den Helder. This lasts until 8 August 1983.
In 1984 she made a visit to Willemstad Curaçao. The following years she made several visits to Norway and Scotland.

On 18 June 1992 she was finally decommissioned and broken up 1994, wearing a special ceremony painting of a Sperm whale.

References

1965 ships
Dolfijn-class submarines
Submarines built by Wilton-Fijenoord